The Community Z Tools (CZT) initiative is based around a SourceForge project to build a set of tools for the Z notation, a formal method useful in software engineering. Tools include support for editing, typechecking and animating Z specifications. There is some support for extensions such as Object-Z and TCOZ. The tools are built using the Java programming language.

CZT was proposed by Andrew Martin of Oxford University in 2001.

References

External links
 CZT SourceForge website
 CZT initiative information by Andrew Martin
 Softpedia information
 CZT: A Framework for Z Tools by Petra Malik and Mark Utting (PDF)

2001 establishments in England
2001 software
Z notation
Research projects
Free software programmed in Java (programming language)
Department of Computer Science, University of Oxford